Baddinsgill Reservoir is a small reservoir in the Scottish Borders area of Scotland close to Carlops, West Linton, and the boundary with Midlothian. It is close to Baddinsgill House. The Lyne Water is dammed to form the reservoir, not the Baddinsgill Burn, which joins the Lyne Water further south, below the reservoir. The earth dam was faced with concrete blocks.

See also 
List of places in the Scottish Borders
List of reservoirs and dams in the United Kingdom
List of places in Scotland
Fruid Reservoir
Megget Reservoir
Talla Reservoir
Westwater Reservoir

References

External links 
Gazetteer for Scotland: Baddinsgill
Geograph image: Baddinsgill Reservoir
Geograph image: Baddinsgill Dam
Repair of Baddinsgill Reservoir by Hesselberg Hydro

Reservoirs in the Scottish Borders